Maddi is a town and union council of Kulachi Tehsil, Dera Ismail Khan, Khyber-Pakhtunkhwa, Pakistan.

Maddi may also refer to:

People

Given name
 Diminutive of Madison
 Diminutive of Maddison
 Diminutive of Madeleine
 Maddi Gay (born 1996), Australian Australian-rules-football player
 Maddi Madd (born Marlon Grimes), U.S. rapper
 Maddi Sudarsanam (1906–1994), Indian politician
 Maddi Torre (born 1996), Spanish soccer player
 Maddi Wesche (born 1999), New Zealander shotputter
 Maddi Wheeler (born 2002), Canadian ice hockey player

Surname
 Chauki Maddi (1929–2018), Brazilian singer

See also

 Corrado Maddii (born 1957), Italian motocross racer
 
 Madi (disambiguation)
 Madhi (disambiguation) 
 Mahdi (disambiguation)

 Maddy (disambiguation) including Maddie
 Mady

 Madie (disambiguation)

 Madison (disambiguation)
 Madeleine (disambiguation)